Perry Hills is an American football quarterback. He played college football at the University of Maryland and was the Terrapins starting quarterback for most of the 2012, 2015 and 2016 seasons. In 2015, Hills broke the school's single-game rushing record for a quarterback with 170 yards against No. 1 Ohio State.

Early life

Born in Pittsburgh, PA, Perry Hills attended Central Catholic High School (Pittsburgh), where he starred both on the gridiron and wrestling mat. As a senior, Hills threw for over 2,000 yards, with 13 touchdowns to only 2 interceptions; Hills was also recognized as an all-state wrestler, winning the state-title at his weight-class.

College career

Statistics
Through the 2016 regular season, Hills' statistics are as follows:

References

External links

American football quarterbacks
Maryland Terrapins football players
Players of American football from Pittsburgh